Etihad Credit Insurance (abbreviated as ECI) is the official export credit agency (ECA) of the UAE government. The agency "aims to support the economic diversification by guaranteeing commercial and non-commercial risks associated with export and re-export of goods and services".

Founded in February 2018, the ECI is a public joint stock company wholly owned by the UAE Federal Government, Abu Dhabi Government, Government of Dubai, Government of the Ajman, Government of Ras Al Khaimah, and the Government of Fujairah. In 2021, ECI was voted as a permanent member of the Berne Union.

Offices 
THE ECI's main office is in the UAE capital of Abu Dhabi, and operates a second office in Dubai.  ECI also has plans to open risk offices internationally, with a focus on markets for halal products.

Agreements 
According to the ECI's annual report, the company extended non-oil support of $3.1 billion, to 92 counties in 2021, covering 18 sectors.  Top destinations for UAE exports included Saudi Arabia, Iraq, India, Oman, Kuwait, and Jordan.

Non-Oil Industry Support
The ECI's main objective is supporting the diversification of the UAE's economy by supporting non-oil export and imports, and major industries supported in 2020 included the chemical industry, steel, construction, cables, food, packaging, electronics, healthcare and printing

See also 

 List of export credit agencies

References 

 Government agencies of the United Arab Emirates
 Export credit agencies